Son Of Retro Pulp Tales is a collection of short fiction edited by Joe R. Lansdale and his son Keith Lansdale. Continuing in the same vein as the earlier book titled Retro Pulp Tales, these stories are more in the tradition of early pulp stories in cheap magazines and pre-1960s horror films. This book was published exclusively by Subterranean Press.

Table of Contents
Introduction- Keith Lansdale
The Crawling Sky- Joe R. Lansdale
Quiet Bullets- Christopher Golden
A Gunfight- David J. Schow
The Forgotten Kingdom- Mike Resnick
The Perfect Nanny- William F. Nolen
Border Town- James Grady
The Catastrophe Box- Cherie Priest
Pretty Green Eyes- Timothy Truman
The Brown Bomber and the Nazi Werewolf of the S.S.- Matt Venne
The Lizard Men of Blood River- Stephen Mertz
The Toad Prince or, Sex Queen of the Martian Pleasure Domes- Harlan Ellison

References

External links
Editor's Official Website
Publisher's Website

Fiction anthologies
American anthologies
2009 anthologies
Horror anthologies
Works by Joe R. Lansdale
Subterranean Press books